Man of Colours is the fifth studio album by Australian rock/synthpop band Icehouse, released locally on 21 September 1987 on Regular Records / Chrysalis Records.

Cover art
The cover artwork, designed by Iva Davies and Robert Kretschmer, depicts a human figure holding three different coloured flowers. An alternate Limited Black Sleeve release depicted the cover art on a reversed background from Regular Records in Australia but had the same track listing.

Release and reception
The album peaked at No. 1 on the Australian album charts for 11 weeks from 5 October 1987 and has sold over 700,000 copies. "Electric Blue" was their only Australian No. 1 single, the release of the album and its five singles marked the zenith of Icehouse's commercial success, both locally and internationally. Several other songs from the album also charted well.

It was the first Australian album to supply five top 30 hit singles "Crazy" (No. 4 in July), "Electric Blue" (co-written by Davies and John Oates of US band Hall & Oates) (No. 1, October), "My Obsession" (No. 12, December), "Man of Colours" (No. 28, February 1988) and "Nothing Too Serious" (No. 29, May 1988). With US chart success for "Crazy", which reached No. 14 on the Billboard Hot 100 and No. 10 on its Mainstream Rock chart, and "Electric Blue" (No. 7 Hot 100, No. 10 Mainstream), the album Man of Colours reached No. #43 on the Billboard 200.

The album won the ARIA Award for Album of the Year and ARIA Award for Highest Selling Album at the ARIA Music Awards of 1988; the associated song "Electric Blue" won 'Most Performed Australasian Popular Work' at the Australasian Performing Right Association (APRA) Music Awards for its writers Davies and Oates.

Reissues
Different versions of the album have been released, the initial Australian release by Regular Records (see infobox above right) was as a ten track vinyl LP or as a music cassette or as a twelve track CD with two additional mixes of "Crazy".  The US / UK release by Chrysalis Records had a different track order from the Australian LP, and the track lengths for the two big singles ("Crazy" and "Electric Blue") are longer on this version of the album.  The 1997 Japanese CD version released by For Life Records had two different tracks added. In 2002, Warner Music Australia re-released Man of Colours, with Davies and Ryan Scott digitally remastering, including five bonus tracks. In Australia, the album was also offered on three limited edition coloured vinyl pressings, which were the colours of the flowers that the human figure on the cover was holding.

Track listing 
Songwriters according to Australasian Performing Right Association (APRA).

Personnel 
Icehouse members
 Iva Davies – vocals, guitars, keyboards, Fairlight CMI, cor anglais
 Robert Kretschmer – guitars
 Simon Lloyd – reeds, brass, keyboards, programming
 Stephen Morgan – bass guitar
 Andy Qunta – keyboards, piano, backing vocals
 Paul Wheeler – drums, percussion

Additional musicians
 Andy Cichon – bass guitar
 Stuart Gordon – strings
 David Lord – additional keyboards
 Glenn Tommey – guitar, percussion
 John Oates – backing vocals on "Electric Blue"
 Shena Power – backing vocals
 Tommy Dassolo – triangle
 Karl Chandler – tuba

Recording details
 Producer – David Lord
 Engineer – David Hemming, David Wright
 Assistants – Carrie Motzing, Greg Henderson
 Studio – EMI Studios 301 and Trash Studios, Sydney, Australia and Crescent Studios, Bath, Somerset
 Mixer – David Lord, assisted by Raine Shine @ Crescent Studios, except:
 "Crazy", mixed by David Lord, assisted by David Hemming @ E.M.I. Studios 301, Sydney
 "Man of Colours" mixed by Iva Davies, assisted by David Hemming @ Albert Studios, Sydney
 "Electric Blue" and "My Obsession" mixed by Michael Brauer @ Sigma Sound Studios, New York City, United States
 Mastering: Don Bartley, assisted by David Hemming @ E.M.I. Studios, Sydney
 Digital remastering (2002) – Iva Davies, Ryan Scott

Art work
 Artwork – Iva Davies, Robert Kretschmer
 Art direction and layout – Sue Goff
 Photography – Hugh Stewart

Charts

Weekly charts

Year-end charts

Certifications and sales

References 

1987 albums
ARIA Award-winning albums
Icehouse (band) albums
Chrysalis Records albums